is a volleyball coach from Japan. Currentry he serves as head coach of Denso Airybees.

Career 
1975 After graduating from Osaka University of Commerce, he became an assistant coach of Unitika.
1992 Assistant coach of Women's national volleyball team in the Barcelona Olympic games.
1995 He became a head coach of Unitika.
2000 Unitika Phoenix was abolished and it moved Toray Arrows.
2005 He retired a head coach and was appointed vice general manager of Toray Arrows.
2006 Denso Airybees had invited him as a head coach.

Honours as a head coach 
V.League/V.Premier League
Champion (1) 1995
Runners-up (2) 2003, 2007–08
Kurowashiki All Japan Volleyball Tournament
Champion (1) 2008

External links 
Denso Airybees Official Website

1952 births
Living people
Japanese men's volleyball players
People from Osaka